Gribtsovo is a rural locality (a selo) in Nesterovskoye Rural Settlement, Sokolsky District, Vologda Oblast, Russia. The population was 54 as of 2002.

Geography 
Gribtsovo is located 40 km north of Sokol (the district's administrative centre) by road. Treparevo is the nearest rural locality.

References 

Rural localities in Sokolsky District, Vologda Oblast